The Horjul dialect (horjulščina) is a Slovene dialect in the Rovte dialect group. It is spoken southwest of Ljubljana in the settlements of Horjul, Polhov Gradec, Log pri Brezovici, Vrhnika, Verd, Logatec, and Kalce.

Phonological and morphological characteristics
The Horjul dialect mostly has pitch accent. It exhibits accentual retraction to ultra-short syllables. The diphthongs ie and ua are the result of newly accented formerly short vowels. There are two semivowels and extensive akanye in the dialect. Soft l is pronounced ľ and soft n as a nasalized j. The vowel i is frequent as a reflex of e or ə; the clusters tl and dl are preserved, but šč > š. The phoneme g has lenited to [ɦ]. Voicing contrast is preserved in final position. The dialect uses the short infinitive (without -i), and the verbal thematic vowel -i- has been replaced by -e-.

References

Slovene dialects